Edith Käthe Elisabeth Schultze-Westrum (30 December 1904 – 20 March 1981) was a German film actress. She appeared in more than 60 films between 1932 and 1979. These included the role of Mrs. Hudson in the 1962 film Sherlock Holmes and the Deadly Necklace.

Selected filmography

 Kiki (1932)
 The Time with You (1948) - Fürsorgehelferin
 Tragödie einer Leidenschaft (1949) - Frau Berowska
 Heimliches Rendezvous (1949) - Fräulein Diethof
 Verspieltes Leben (1949) - Elisabeth von Kanzler
 Chased by the Devil (1950) - Schwester Grete
 Das ewige Spiel (1951)
 Captive Soul (1952)
 House of Life (1952) - Josepha Spratt
 The Great Temptation (1952) - Frau Riebold
 Zwerg Nase (1953) - Hexe
 I and You (1953) - Mutter Erdmann
 Love and Trumpets (1954) - Frau von Barro
 Sauerbruch – Das war mein Leben (1954) - Sekretärin (uncredited)
 The Beginning Was Sin (1954) - Mutter der Rosalia
 La Paura (1954)
 The Dark Star (1955) - Frau Lechner
  (1955) - Frau Brahm
 Weil du arm bist, mußt du früher sterben (1956)
 Vergiß wenn Du kannst (1956) - Kekki, Lappländerin
 Santa Lucia (1956) - Tante Rosa
 Sand, Love and Salt (1957) - Mother of Piero
 Immer wenn der Tag beginnt (1957) - Frau Kleinschmidt - Hans' Mutter
 Mein Mädchen ist ein Postillion (1958)
 Dorothea Angermann (1959) - Frau Lüders
 Die Brücke (1959) - Mother Bernhard
 Love Now, Pay Later (1959) - Frau Kroll, Putzfrau
 Darkness Fell on Gotenhafen (1960) - Mutter Reiser
 Soldatensender Calais (1960) - Frau Schmitz, Portiersche
 Weit ist der Weg (1960) - Schwester Teresa
 Via Mala (1961) - Mutter Lauretz
 Die Stunde, die du glücklich bist (1961) - Wirtschafterin
 Jeder stirbt für sich allein (1962, TV Movie) - Anna Quangel
 Escape from East Berlin (1962) - Mother Schröder
 Sherlock Holmes and the Deadly Necklace (1962) - Mrs. Hudson
 The Forester's Daughter (1962)
 Ostrva (1963)
 Ein Frauenarzt klagt an (1964) - Mutter Hartmann
 Praetorius (1965) - (uncredited)
 The House in Karp Lane (1965) - Alte Kauders
 All People Will Be Brothers (1973) - Frau Schermoly
 Derrick (1975-1976, TV Series) - Toilettenfrau / Frau Hofer
  (1977, TV Movie) - Zofia

References

External links

1904 births
1981 deaths
German film actresses
People from Wiesbaden
German television actresses
20th-century German actresses